Manzo is a name that originated in Spain (used usually as a surname) that may refer to: 

Andrea Manzo (born 1961), Italian football manager and former midfielder
Anthony George Manzo (born 1958), elected Senator for the Taraba North constituency in Nigeria
Armando Manzo (born 1958), retired Mexican footballer
Carl Manzo (born 1964), American artist
Carlos Reyes-Manzo (born 1944), documentary photographer and poet
Caroline Manzo (born 1961), American television personality, entrepreneur and radio show host
Dina Manzo, American reality television personality and Caroline Manzo's sister
Frank Manzo, member of the Lucchese crime family
Louis Manzo (born 1955), American politician in the New Jersey General Assembly
Manuel Manzo (born 1952), former footballer
Michael Manzo, former chief of staff for Pennsylvania House of Representatives Majority Leader H. William DeWeese
Reynaldo Valdés Manzo (born 1950), Mexican politician affiliated to the Party of the Democratic Revolution
Rodolfo Manzo (born 1949), retired professional football defender from Peru
Terukuni Manzo (1919–1977), sumo wrestler from Ogachi, Akita Prefecture, Japan

First name:
Manzo Iwata (1924–1993), Japanese martial artist
Manzo Nagano (1855–1923), the first Japanese person to officially immigrate to Canada
Manzō Wowari (born 1948), Japanese actor and voice actor from Aichi Prefecture

See also
Manzo-Village Person character from the Film Seven Samurai, played by Kamatari Fujiwara
Manz
Manzano (disambiguation)
Manzoni (disambiguation)
Manzonia
Mwanzo